The Dymshits–Kuznetsov aircraft hijacking affair, also known as The First Leningrad Trial or Operation Wedding (or Дело группы Дымшица-Кузнецова) (Leningrad Process), was an attempt to take an empty civilian aircraft on 15 June 1970 by a group of 16 Soviet refuseniks in order to escape to the West. Even though the attempt was unsuccessful, it was a notable event in the course of the Cold War because it drew international attention to human rights violations in the Soviet Union and resulted in the temporary loosening of emigration restrictions.

Background 
In the wake of the 1967 Six-Day War, the Soviet Union broke off diplomatic relations with Israel. To apply for an exit visa, the applicants (and often their entire families) would have to quit their jobs, which in turn would make them vulnerable to charges of social parasitism, a criminal offense. A large number of Soviet Jews applied for exit visas to leave the Soviet Union. While some were allowed to leave, many were refused permission to emigrate, either immediately or after their cases would languish for years in the OVIR (ОВиР, "Отдел Виз и Регистрации", "Otdel Viz i Registratsii", English: Office of Visas and Registration), the MVD (Soviet Ministry of Internal Affairs) department responsible for exit visas. In many instances, the reason given for denial was that these persons had been given access, at some point in their careers, to information vital to Soviet national security and could not be allowed to leave.

Incident 
In 1970, a group of sixteen Refuseniks (two of whom were non-Jewish), organized by dissident Edward Kuznetsov (who already had served a seven-year term in prison for publishing an anti-Soviet newspaper called "Phoenix"), plotted to buy all the seats on a small 12-seater Antonov An-2 (colloquially known as "кукурузник," kukuruznik) on a Leningrad-Priozersk local flight, under the guise of a trip to a wedding; throw out the pilots before takeoff from an intermediate stop; and fly it to Sweden. Their final goal was to arrive in Israel. One of the participants, Mark Dymshits, was a former military pilot, who had experience flying the An-2s. The group called the plan "Operation Wedding".

After the plan had evolved over a period of months, it was finally launched in June 1970. On the morning of 15 June the group arrived together in Smolny (later Rzhevka) Airport near Leningrad, only to be arrested by the KGB.

Aftermath 

The accused were charged for high treason, punishable by death under Article 64 of the Penal code of the Russian Soviet Federative Socialist Republic (RSFSR). In a trial that took place from 15 to 24 December 1970, Mark Dymshits (age: 43) and Eduard Kuznetsov (age: 30) received a death sentence.<ref name="Mozorov-1999">Mozorov, Boris (Ed.) (1999). Documents on Soviet Jewish Emigration. London; Portland, OR: Frank Cass. p. 90, note 3.</ref> The prison sentences received by nine other participants were as follows: Sylva Zalmanson (age: 25; then Kuznetsov's wife, and the only woman on trial), 10 years; Yosef Mendelevitch (age: 23) and Yuri Fedorov, 15 years; Aleksey Murzhenko (age: 27 or 28), 14 years; Arie (Leib) Hanoch (age: 25), 13 years; Anatoli Altmann (age: 28), 12 years; Boris Penson (age: 23), 10 years; Israel Zalmanson (age: 21), 8 years; and Mendel Bodnya (age: 32), 4 years."Proceedings of the Leningrad Hijacking Trial." In: Eduard Kuznetsov (1975). Prison Diaries. Translated from the Russian by Howard Spier. New York: Stein and Day. pp. 217–254. The account is described as having been "recorded by a relative of one of the accused who was present in the courtroom" (p. 217); ages or years of birth, as well as other biographical details, are included for most of the defendants. Wolf Zalmanson (age: 31), brother of Sylva and Israel Zalmanson, who was a lieutenant in the Soviet army, was tried separately by a military tribunal and, on 2 January 1971, sentenced to 10 years imprisonment.

After international protests the Judicial Commission for Criminal Cases of the RSFSR Supreme Court in Moscow considered an appeal of the cases, and modified the sentences, commuting the capital sentences of Dymshits and Kuznetsov to 15 years in prison, and reducing the length of prison terms for several other defendants by two to five years.

Strong international condemnations caused the Soviet authorities to significantly increase the emigration quota. In the years 1960 through 1970, only 4,000 people had (legally) emigrated from the USSR; after the trial, in the period from 1971 to 1980, 347,100 people received a visa to leave the USSR, of whom 245,951 were Jews.

In August 1974, Sylva Zalmanson was released as part of an Israeli secret Soviet prisoner exchange with the spy Yuri Linov that took place in Berlin, after which she immigrated to Israel, arriving in September. In the following years she advocated for the release of her husband, Edward Kuznetsov, and other dissidents.Ghert-Zand, Renee (29 December 2012). "My mom and dad, the would-be Zionist plane hijackers." The Times of Israel. Retrieved 23 November 2015.

Kuznetsov was finally released on 27 April 1979, and joined his wife in Israel. Mark Dymshits was released at the same time, along with three other prominent Soviet dissidents, Aleksandr Ginzburg, Valentin Moroz, and Georgy Vins. The release of the five dissidents came after long negotiations as part of a prisoner exchange for two Soviet foreign intelligence officers, Rudolf Chernyaev and Valdik Enger. The Soviet operatives, who were employed at the time at the United Nations Secretariat, had been sentenced in a U.S. federal court to 50 years in prison, in October 1978, following their arrest in New Jersey the previous May, while collecting an agent's report from a secret cache (a co-conspirator, Vladimir Zinyakin, an attaché of the Soviet mission to the UN, had diplomatic immunity, and was not charged).

After immigrating to Israel, Kuznetsov headed the news department of "Radio Liberty" (1983–1990), and was the chief editor of the largest Israeli Russian-language newspaper, Вести (1990–1999), the most popular Russian-language newspaper outside of Russia.

"The Committee to Free the Leningrad Three," headed by Colorado State Senator Tilman Bishop, was instrumental in organizing grassroots and diplomatic campaigns to release the remaining prisoners.

In February 1981, Mendelevitch was released and joined his family in Israel. He urged continuance of the campaign to free two members of the group, Fedorov and Murzhenko: "The fact that both are non-Jewish is the worst example of Soviet discrimination and must not pass without protest."

On 15 June 1984, Aleksei Murzhenko (1942-1999) was released, only to be rearrested for "parole violation" and sentenced to another two years; he was released June 4, 1987 and immigrated to the USA Feb. 29, 1988. In June 1985, after serving 15 years, Yuri Fedorov was released under the 101st kilometre settlement restriction. He was denied an exit visa until 1988, when he left for the United States. In 1998, he founded The Gratitude Fund in order to commemorate the Soviet dissidents "who waged a war against Soviet power and sacrificed their personal freedom and their lives for democracy."

In 2016, Operation Wedding'', a documentary about the hijacking directed by Anat Zalmanson-Kuznetsov (the daughter of Kuznetsov and Sylva Zalmanson, two participants in the plot) was released.

See also 

 Eastern Bloc emigration and defection
 Jackson–Vanik amendment

Notes 
  ИСТОРИЯ ИНАКОМЫСЛИЯ В СССР (The History of Dissident Movement in the USSR) by Ludmila Alekseyeva. Vilnius, 1992 (Russian)
 "The Leningrad trial of the 'hijackers'," A Chronicle of Current Events (17.6), 31 December 1970, and compare
 "The Aeroplane affair", A Chronicle of Current Events (20.1), 2 July 1971.

References

External links 
   "OPERATION WEDDING" A documentary film by Anat Zalmanson-Kuznetsov
 The role of Sen. Tilman Bishop in "The Committee to Free the Leningrad Three"
 When Russian Jews tried to steal a plane to reach Israel, Shlomit Sharvit Barzilay YNET, December 19th, 2020
 Hijacking History ,Fifty years ago today in Leningrad, a small group of Soviet Jews was tried for attempting a daring escape to Israel. Eerily, their story is relevant again—this time, for American Jews.  Izabella Tabarovsky, Tablet December 24th, 2020
 Declaration and ‘Last Will’ of the Leningrad Hijackers  Izabella Tabarovsky, Tablet December 24th, 2020

Aircraft hijackings
Aviation accidents and incidents in Russia
Aviation accidents and incidents in the Soviet Union
Aviation accidents and incidents in 1970
1970 in the Soviet Union
Aeroflot accidents and incidents
Soviet Union–United States relations
Israel–Soviet Union relations
1970 in international relations
June 1970 events in Europe